A tea sandwich (also referred to as finger sandwich) is a small prepared sandwich meant to be eaten at afternoon teatime to stave off hunger until the main meal.

The tea sandwich may take a number of different forms, but should be easy to handle, and should be capable of being eaten in two or three bites. It may be a long, narrow sandwich, a triangular half-sandwich, or a small biscuit. It may also be cut into other decorative shapes with a cookie cutter.

The bread is traditionally white, thinly sliced, and buttered. The bread crust is cut away cleanly from the sandwich after the sandwich has been prepared but before serving. Modern bread variations might include wheat, pumpernickel, sour dough or rye bread. The bread used for preparing finger sandwiches is sometimes referred to as sandwich bread.

Fillings are light, and are "dainty" or "delicate" in proportion to the amount of bread. Spreads might include butter, cream cheese or mayonnaise mixtures, and the sandwiches often feature fresh vegetables such as radishes, olives, cucumber, asparagus, or watercress. The cucumber tea sandwich in particular is considered the quintessential tea sandwich. Other popular tea sandwich fillings include tomatoes, pimento cheese, ham with mustard, smoked salmon with cream cheese, fruit jam, curried chicken, fish paste, and egg salad.

See also

 Canapé
 Cucumber sandwich
 Tapas
 Pinchos
 Tramezzino
 List of sandwiches

References

 

British sandwiches
Tea in the United Kingdom